James Edison Picken (August 7, 1903 – April 2, 1975) was an early American professional basketball and minor league baseball player. He was born in East Liverpool, Ohio but grew up in Collingswood, New Jersey. Picken's basketball career during the 1920s and 1930s saw him spend time in the original American Basketball League, the Eastern Basketball League, and the Metropolitan Basketball League. His younger brother, Eddie Picken, was also a professional basketball player.

Picken attended Collingswood High School and then Dartmouth College, where he lettered in football, soccer, basketball, and baseball. Immediately after college he played for the Easton Farmers in the Eastern Shore League during the 1927 season, but quit after one year. He had only managed a .196 batting average in 51 at bats, so he decided to focus on playing professional basketball as well as becoming a schoolteacher. Over the years he coached high school football, basketball, and baseball at various high schools in New York and New Jersey. While coaching Audubon High School's football team, he won three conference championships in nine years.

A resident of Moorestown, New Jersey, Picken died there on April 2, 1975.

References
General
 Courier-Post (Cherry Hill, New Jersey), April 4, 1975. Retrieved on August 8, 2019.
 The Record (Troy, New York), April 9, 1975. Retrieved on August 8, 2019.

Specific

1903 births
1975 deaths
American baseball players
American Basketball League (1925–1955) players
American men's basketball players
United States Navy personnel of World War II
Schoolteachers from New Jersey
Baseball coaches from New Jersey
Baseball players from New Jersey
Basketball coaches from New Jersey
Basketball players from New Jersey
Collingswood High School alumni
Dartmouth Big Green baseball players
Dartmouth Big Green football players
Dartmouth Big Green men's basketball players
Dartmouth Big Green men's soccer players
Easton Farmers players
Forwards (basketball)
High school baseball coaches in the United States
High school basketball coaches in the United States
High school football coaches in New Jersey
Paterson Crescents players
People from Collingswood, New Jersey
People from East Liverpool, Ohio
People from Moorestown, New Jersey
Sportspeople from Camden County, New Jersey
Association footballers not categorized by position
Association football players not categorized by nationality